Bennasser Benchohra is a town and commune in Laghouat Province, Algeria. As of 2008, the town's population was 9,621 people.

References

Communes of Laghouat Province